The 2022–23 season is the 114th season in the existence of Hartlepool United Football Club and the club's second consecutive season in League Two. In addition to the league, they will also compete in the FA Cup, the EFL Cup and the EFL Trophy.

Players

Transfers

Transfers in

Loans in

Loans out

Transfers out

Competitions

Pre-season friendlies
Pools announced their first pre-season friendly with Blackburn Rovers visiting The Suit Direct Stadium on 20 July. A day later, the club announced their opening two matches for the pre-season schedule, against Billingham Synthonia and Marske United. A fixture with Lincoln City was revealed on 16 May. A sixth pre-season fixture, against Sunderland was confirmed on June 8. Another addition to the pre-season schedule was confirmed a day later, against St Mirren.

League Two

League table

Results summary

Results by matchday

Matches
On 23 June, the league fixtures were announced. Hartlepool's away fixture against Mansfield Town was moved from 1 October 2022 to 30 September 2022. Following the death of Queen Elizabeth II, matches across the UK were postponed as a mark of respect. With Hartlepool due to play at home to Doncaster Rovers on 10 September 2022, the match was postponed and rearranged for 4 October 2022. Hartlepool's planned away fixture at Crawley Town for 10 December 2022 was rearranged for 9 December 2022 at 19:45 to avoid potential clashes with England matches during the 2022 FIFA World Cup. Hartlepool's planned away fixture for Bradford City on 18 March 2023 was moved forward from 15:00 to 13:00. Hartlepool's scheduled home fixture on 17 December 2022 at home to Newport County was postponed due to a frozen pitch. The match was subsequently rearranged for 21 February 2023. Due to the Coronation of Charles III and Camilla, all Football League final fixtures were moved. Therefore, League Two matches were moved to 8 May 2023 at 12:30 from 6 May 2023.

FA Cup

On 19 October 2022, Hartlepool were drawn away to National League side Solihull Moors. In the second round they faced Harrogate Town at home. A third round tie against Stoke City at home was next for the Pools.

EFL Cup

On 23 June 2022, Hartlepool were drawn away to Championship side Blackburn Rovers. On 29 June 2022, the final date was finalised for the Blackburn fixture.

EFL Trophy

On 23 June, the group stage draw was finalised.

Squad statistics

Appearances and goals

|}

Goalscorers

Clean sheets

Suspensions

References 

Hartlepool United
Hartlepool United F.C. seasons